Monnington on Wye is a village in western Herefordshire, England, located between Hereford and Hay-on-Wye.

The place-name 'Monnington' is first attested in the Domesday Book of 1086, where it appears as Manitune. The name means 'Manna's town or settlement', or 'the town or settlement of Manna's people'.

Monnington is joined with Brobury for civil parish purposes as Brobury with Monnington-on-Wye.

The church of St Mary's is a grade I listed building.

Monnington Court includes a moot hall, completed before 1230.

Monnington is regarded as a possible location of Owain Glyndŵr's retirement, death and burial.

References

External links

Villages in Herefordshire